Donna Nelson may refer to:

Donna Nelson (born 1954) is an American chemist.
Dona Nelson (born 1947), American painter
Donna G. Nelson (born 1943), American politician